Ramoche Temple is a Buddhist monastery in Lhasa, Tibet Autonomous Region. It dates back to the seventh century and is considered to be the most important temple in the city after the Jokhang Temple. Situated in the northwestern part of the Tibetan capital, it is east of the Potala and north of the Jokhang. The site occupies an area of 4,000 square meters (almost one acre).

History
Ramoche is considered to be the sister temple to the Jokhang which was completed about the same time. Tradition says that it was built originally to house the much revered Jowo Rinpoche statue, carried to Lhasa via Lhagang in a wooden cart, brought to Tibet when Princess Wencheng came to Lhasa. Unlike, the Jokhang, Ramoche was originally built in Chinese style. During Mangsong Mangtsen's reign (649-676), because of a threat that the Tang Chinese might invade, Princess Wencheng is said to have had the statue of Jowo Rinpoche hidden in a secret chamber in the Jokhang. Princess Jincheng, sometime after 710 CE, had it placed in the central chapel of the Jokhang. It was replaced at Ramoche by a statue of Jowo Mikyo Dorje, a small bronze statue of the Buddha when he was eight years old, crafted by Vishvakarman, and brought to Lhasa by the Nepalese queen, Bhrikuti. It was badly damaged by the Red Guards during the Cultural Revolution.

The temple was badly damaged during the Mongol invasions and there is no certainty that the statue that remained in 1959 was the original one. The original temple was destroyed by fire, and the present three-storied building was constructed in 1474. Soon after it became the Assembly Hall of the Gyuto Tratsang, or Upper Tantric College of Lhasa and was home to 500 monks. There was a close connection with Yerpa which provided summer quarters for the monks.

Destruction and restoration

The temple was gutted by fire and destroyed in the 1959 Lhasa uprising against Chinese occupation and the bronze statue disappeared. In 1983 the lower part of it was said to have been found in a Lhasa rubbish tip, and the upper half in Beijing. Thanks to the efforts of Ri ‘bur sprul sku, the parts were joined in the Ramoche Temple, which was partially restored in 1986, yet still showed damage in 1993.

A major restoration was undertaken in 1986 and the temple now has three stories. Near the main entrance to the building are ten pillars displaying local relics and symbols such as lotus flowers, jewellery, coiling clouds and Tibetan characters. The first floor has an atrium off which opens a scripture hall and the winding corridors of a Buddha palace. The second floor is mainly residential but has a chapel with an image of Buddha as King of the Nagas, and the third floor provides sleeping quarters reserved for the use of the Dalai Lama.

Footnotes

References
Dorje, Gyume (1999). Footprint Tibet Handbook with Bhutan. Footprint Handbooks, Bath, England. .

External links
Short history and some photos of Ramoche

Buddhist monasteries in Lhasa
Buddhist temples in Tibet
Gelug monasteries and temples
Chengguan District, Lhasa
Major National Historical and Cultural Sites in Tibet